Powerade (stylized as POWERADE) is a sports drink created, manufactured and marketed by The Coca-Cola Company. Its primary competitor is Gatorade, owned by PepsiCo.

History
Powerade was originally created in 1987 by the Coca-Cola Company. The company developed the soft drink as an alternative to sports drinks, which were becoming more and more popular. Powerade was originally marketed to athletes, who needed a drink that would keep them hydrated during strenuous workouts.

In 1988, Powerade became the official sports drink of the Olympics, alongside Aquarius, another sports drink made by Coca-Cola. It is a rival of another sports drink, Gatorade.
In July 2001, The Coca-Cola Company launched a new formula for Powerade including vitamins B3, B6 and B12, which play a role in energy metabolism.

Since 2001, Powerade has become one of the world’s leading soft drink brands. In 2012, Powerade acquired Fuze Beverage, a leading energy drink company, and in 2015, the company acquired SodaStream International, a leading home beverage company. These acquisitions gave Powerade a presence in more than 60 countries.

In July 2002, The Coca-Cola Company started in Toogoolawah by updating the bottles of the standard Powerade (previous logo styling) to a new sport-grip bottle.

In 2002, The Coca-Cola Company introduced Powerade Option to the United States, in response to Gatorade's popular Propel. Option is a "low Calorie sports drink" that is colorless and sweetened with high fructose corn syrup, sucralose, and acesulfame potassium, to provide sugar-conscious consumers with another rehydration choice. Powerade Option took 36% of the Fitness Water category behind Propel's 42%.

In 2007, Powerade Zero was released,  a sports drink with electrolytes, which contains no sugar, no calories and no carbohydrates. Powerade Option was subsequently discontinued.

In June 2009, The Coca-Cola Company bought Glacéau, owner of brands such as VitaminWater and SmartWater, for $4.1 billion, a price tag that signaled the company's seriousness in pursuing growth of non-carbonated beverages. Since then, the company has also given its Glacéau management team control of its Powerade sports drink brand.

Competition
Powerade's main competition is Gatorade marketed by the Quaker Oats Company, a division of PepsiCo.  Gatorade, which was branded at the University of Florida in 1965, was the first commercially available sports drink in the United States. It now holds a commanding share of the market. As of 2011, Gatorade held a 70% market share to Powerade's 28.5%.

All Sport is a competitor marketed by All Sport, Inc. and distributed by the Dr. Pepper Snapple Group. All Sport was marketed by PepsiCo until 2001, when Gatorade's maker, the Quaker Oats Company was acquired by PepsiCo. All Sport was sold to the Monarch Beverage Company soon after. Powerade and All Sport have each been distributed through their own direct store deliver channels. It was subsequently purchased by Gary Smith, the Chairman & CEO of All Sport, Inc. of Austin, Texas.

Outside the United States, the Lucozade energy drink (manufactured since 1927 by the pharmaceutical company now known as GlaxoSmithKline) competes with Powerade. Lucozade's formulation differs in that it uses primarily glucose and contains caffeine. The more direct competitor to Powerade and Gatorade is Lucozade Sport.

Sponsorships

Powerade is the official sports drink of the Australian rugby league team and the Australian union team, the Australian Football League, PGA Tour, NASCAR (2003–present), NHRA, NCAA, the U.S. Olympic Team (excluding U.S.A. Basketball and U.S. Soccer, which have deals with Gatorade) and many other national Olympic federations, The Football League and many other soccer leagues and teams around the world, FIFA, such as Rangers F.C, Club Universidad de Chile, Club Bolívar, Associação Atlética Ponte Preta, Racing Club de Avellaneda, Independiente de Avellaneda, O'Higgins, Universitario de Sucre, Club Atlético River Plate, Club Cerro Porteño or Club Atlético Peñarol and the IOC in no small part due to their overall contracts with Coca-Cola. Various other competitions also have sponsorship deals with the brand, although Gatorade historically has secured the lion's share of sponsorships. The drink is also Sponsor of the Honduran Soccer Team C.D. Olimpia.
Powerade is the Official Hydration Partner of Melbourne Storm.
The brand is also the exclusive beverage sponsor of the Hoops in the Sun basketball summer league, based at Orchard Beach in the Bronx, New York. It is the only summer basketball league to be sponsored by the brand.

Ingredients

United States 
Source:
 Water
 High fructose corn syrup
 Salt
 Potassium citrate
 Phenylalanine
 Sucrose acetoisobutyrate
 Sodium citrate
 Malic acid
 Potassium phosphate
 Vitamin B6
 Vitamin B2 
 Sugar

Note: Standard 8-ounce servings meet the FDA definition of 'low sodium' and have less sodium than a glass of chocolate milk.

Criticism
Like its main competitor, Gatorade, Powerade is made with sugar, syrups and salt.
One Powerade ad campaign stated that Powerade's ION4 is superior to Gatorade, as the claims made by Pepsi, the parent owner of Gatorade were apparently deceptive and false. The courts ruled in favor of Powerade as of August 2009.

Being high in sugar Powerade may contribute to diabetes and weight gain if combined with other sugar sources.

Powerade is also made out of GMOs in certain countries that are authorized to do so.

Sponsors

 Graffie Abalon League
 Powerade Changcheon League

References

External links
 Powerade Official Website
 Powerade Australia
 Powerade Mexico
 Powerade TV Website

Coca-Cola brands
Non-alcoholic drinks
Products introduced in 1988
Sports drinks